The AB magnitude system is an astronomical magnitude system. Unlike many other magnitude systems, it is based on flux measurements that are calibrated in absolute units, namely spectral flux densities.

Definition 

The monochromatic AB magnitude is defined as the logarithm of a spectral flux density with the usual scaling of astronomical magnitudes and a zero-point of about  janskys (symbol Jy), where 1 Jy =  =  ("about" because the true definition of the zero point is based on magnitudes as shown below). If the spectral flux density is denoted , the monochromatic AB magnitude is:

or, with  still in janskys,

The exact definition is stated relative to the cgs units of :

Inverting this leads to the true definition of the numerical value "" often cited:

 

Actual measurements are always made across some continuous range of wavelengths. The bandpass AB magnitude is defined so that the zero point corresponds to a bandpass-averaged spectral flux density of about :

where  is the "equal-energy" filter response function and the  term assumes that the detector is a photon-counting device such as a CCD or photomultiplier. (Filter responses are sometimes expressed as quantum efficiencies, that is, in terms of their response per photon, rather than per unit energy.

The STMAG system is similarly defined, but for constant flux per unit wavelength interval instead.

AB stands for "absolute" in the sense that no relative reference object is used (unlike using Vega as a baseline object). This must not be confused with absolute magnitude in the sense of the apparent brightness of an object if seen from a distance of 10 parsecs.

Expression in terms of  

In some fields, spectral flux densities are expressed per unit wavelength, rather than per unit frequency, . At any specific wavelength,

If the wavelength unit is ångströms,

This can then be plugged into the equations above.

The "pivot wavelength" of a given bandpass is the value of  that makes the above conversion exact for observations made in that bandpass. For an equal-energy response function as defined above, it is 

For a response function expressed in the quantum-efficiency convention, it is:

Conversion from other magnitude systems 

Magnitudes in the AB system can be converted to other systems. However, because all magnitude systems involve integration of some assumed source spectrum over some assumed passband, such conversions are not necessarily trivial to calculate, and precise conversions depend on the actual bandpass of the observations in question. Various authors have computed conversions for standard situations.

References

External links
Conversion from AB magnitudes to Johnson magnitudes

Observational astronomy